Onorato Carlandi (15 May 1848, in Rome – 11 April 1939, in Rome) was an Italian painter, mainly of watercolors of Rome, the surrounding countryside and of Great Britain. He was married to the painter, Lina Haverty (?-1950), daughter of the Irish historian and journalist, Martin Haverty.

Biography
His grandfather was Fortunato Pio Castellani, founder of the eponymous jewelry company. He was originally destined for a career as a lawyer, but went against his family's wishes and enrolled at the Accademia di belle arti di Roma.

At eighteen, he briefly served as a volunteer with the Cacciatori delle Alpi of Giuseppe Garibaldi. After completing his education at the Accademia, he moved to Naples to continue his training.

In 1880, he went to England, to study the English landscape artists. He lived in London until 1891, and became married to Selina Haverty; daughter of an Irish historian. When he returned to Rome, he participated in the activities of the artists' association, "". When this group dissolved, he and several others created "", a society devoted to plein aire painting and informal socializing. While there, he made friends with the Tuscan artist, Cesare Bertolla, and they made numerous trips to paint in the marshes of the Maccarese. In 1908, he was initiated into the Masonic Lodge, "Rienzi".

His works may be seen at the Galleria Nazionale d'Arte Moderna, Galleria Comunale d'Arte Moderna, the gallery of the Accademia di San Luca, the Museo di Roma and the Turin Civic Gallery of Modern and Contemporary Art.

Selected paintings

References

Further reading
 Arnaldo Cervesato, La campagna romana nella pittura dell'Ottocento, Editrice Vela, 1982
 Renato Mammucari, I 25 della campagna romana: 1904-2004, Editrice Vela, 2005
 Poesia della natura: acquerelli di Onorato Carlandi dalle collezioni della Galleria comunale d'arte moderna, Gangemi, 2011

External links

More works by Carlandi @ ArtNet
Portrait of Carlandi by his wife, Lina

1848 births
1939 deaths
Painters from Rome
19th-century Italian painters
Italian male painters
19th-century British painters
British male painters
20th-century Italian painters
Italian watercolourists
19th-century Italian male artists
20th-century Italian male artists
19th-century British male artists